= Katharina Bosse =

Finnish photographer

- Born: 1968 (age 56–57)
- Known for: Photography
- Website: katharinabosse.com

Katharina Bosse (born 1968) is a Finnish photographer.

Her work is included in the collections of the Museum of Fine Arts Houston, the Centre Pompidou, Paris, and the Museum of Modern Art, New York.
